This is a list of the members of the Dewan Negara (Senate) of the Tenth Parliament of Malaysia.

Elected by the State Legislative Assembly

Nominated by the Prime Minister and appointed by the Yang di-Pertuan Agong

Death in office
 Poo Yew Choy (d. 18 March 2003)

Footnotes

References

Malaysian parliaments
Lists of members of the Dewan Negara